The 2016 All-Ireland Senior Camogie Championship Final is the eighty-fifth All-Ireland Final and the deciding match of the 2016 All-Ireland Senior Camogie Championship, an inter-county camogie tournament for the top teams in Ireland. It took place on Sunday 11 September in Croke Park.

Paths to the final
Cork defeated Wexford, Limerick, Waterford and Clare and lost to Offaly in the group stage. They defeated Wexford in the All-Ireland semi-final by 4 points. A win for Cork would complete a three-in-a-row.

Kilkenny defeated Tipperary, Dublin and Derry and lost to Galway in the group stage. They beat Offaly by 11 points in the All-Ireland quarter-final, and beat Galway in the All-Ireland semi-final by 2 points. Kilkenny have not won the All-Ireland since 1994, and have lost 6 All-Ireland finals since then.

Details

References

Camogie
All-Ireland Senior Camogie Championship Finals
All-Ireland Senior Camogie Championship Final
All-Ireland Senior Camogie Championship Final, 2016